Sui is a village in Lunkaransar tehsil in Bikaner district in Rajasthan, India. Its nearby village is Shekhsar.

External links
National Panchayat Portal,Panchayat Informatics Division,NIC
List of Panchayat Samito-Gram Panchayats and Sarpanch in Bikaner District
 delimitation Commission Report Bikaner

Villages in Bikaner district